Chol Gala Mosque (sometimes also transliterated as Chol Qala Mosque) was an Azerbaijani mosque located in Shusha, Azerbaijan about 350 km southwest from capital Baku.It was under occupation of Armenian forces since the capture of the city on May 8, 1992, until its recapture by Azerbaijan on 8 November 2020.

Overview
The mosque is located on G. Zakir street of Chol Gala neighborhood of Shusha. Chol Gala neighbourhood is one of 9 lower and earlier neighbourhoods of Shusha. In total, there are 17 main neighbourhoods. Chol Gala Mosque was one of the 17th mosques functioning in Shusha by the end of the 19th century. There were no minarets and exterior design of Chol Gala Mosque followed a rectangular plan neighborhood mosque building with interior completely complying with Islamic religious architecture. There was a three-nave prayer hall in the mosque. Chol Gala spring by the mosque supplied the neighbourhood with the famous mineral water of Shusha. The mosque was among the most valuable monuments of the Shusha State Historical and Architectural Reserve.

See also

Yukhari Govhar Agha Mosque
Ashaghi Govhar Agha Mosque
Saatli Mosque
Seyidli Mosque
Khoja Marjanli Mosque
Guyulug Mosque
Taza Mahalla Mosque
Shahbulag Mosque

References

External links

Chol Gala street in Shusha, Azerbaijan
Karabakh Monuments

Mosques in Shusha
18th-century mosques
Shia mosques in Azerbaijan